(), also called , is an ancient appellation for knots in China. The term Chinese knotting only became known in recent years when it was summarized by Lydia Chen in the 1980s.

Etymology 

The Chinese character for 《》in traditional Chinese and《》in simplified Chinese, is a specific term which refers to knotting, enmeshing, and wrapping. 

The Chinese character for 《》refers to the lace or flat ribbon woven from silk thread which can used to decorate clothing.

Usage 

According to Dream of the Red Chamber, making  means making knots that can be used on waist as knotting belt; the  could also be as decorative knots with tassel hanging for small object or furnishing (similar to the  used in the ). As a form of knot-craft, it could be used to knot a net sachet for containing small objects.

The knot at the waist by ribbon can be seen from many artworks especially in the beauty painting and ancient literature description recorded that the tradition of knot ribbon can be traced back Spring and Autumn Period (770 – 76 BCE), for example in the chapter 《》of the 《》, the tradition of tying ribbon as knots to the belt is recorded.

Gallery

See also 

 Chinese knotting
 Frog (fastening) – a fastener which originated from China and is now typically used in cheongsam
 Hanfu accessories

References 

Arts in China
Chinese folk art
Decorative knots
Hanfu